Baker's Camp Covered Bridge, also known as Hillis Bridge, is a covered bridge in northern Putnam County, Indiana, east of the town of Bainbridge.

It is an example of the Burr arch truss design.

Nearby bridges
 Rolling Stone Bridge
 Pine Bluff Bridge

References

External links
 Historic Bridges of the United States: Baker's Camp Covered Bridge

Covered bridges in Indiana
Transportation buildings and structures in Putnam County, Indiana
Tourist attractions in Putnam County, Indiana
Road bridges in Indiana
Wooden bridges in Indiana
Burr Truss bridges in the United States
Bridges completed in 1901